David Woodsome is an American politician from Maine. Woodsome, a Republican from Waterboro, Maine, was elected to the Maine Senate in November 2014.

Woodsome attended the University of Maine.

References

Year of birth missing (living people)
Living people
People from Waterboro, Maine
Republican Party Maine state senators
University of Maine alumni
Place of birth missing (living people)
21st-century American politicians
Fryeburg Academy alumni